The Culling is a first-person action 
battle royale game developed and published by American studio Xaviant. Following an early access beta phase, the game was released for Linux, Microsoft Windows, and Xbox One on October 5, 2017.

The Culling initially was popular, but in the wake of two other battle royale games, PlayerUnknown's Battlegrounds and Fortnite Battle Royale, the player base for The Culling waned, and Xaviant halted future development in December 2017. The company later announced a sequel, The Culling 2, which was released in July 2018, amid the popularity of Fortnite Battle Royale. It was panned by players and lacked sufficient players for full matches within 19 hours, leading Xaviant to pull the sequel from marketplaces, and instead restart work on adapting The Culling as a free-to-play title. The game servers were finally shut down on May 15, 2019, with the game no longer being purchasable on any platforms.

Gameplay 
Sixteen players are placed in an arena (either a small island or a prison) full of various buildings containing loot. The maps contain caves, bridges, poison gas, explosive barrels, and more. Upon completing various tasks such as living for a few minutes, killing other players, traveling certain distances or interacting with the environment, players receive "F.U.N.C", which is the name of the in-game currency used to craft or purchase equipment and upgrades each match. When particular perks and air drops are put together they provide unique strengths and weaknesses. Players call these combinations "builds". Selecting the correct perks can provide players with an edge based on their play style.

Development 
The Culling was developed by Xaviant. Having finished Lichdom: Battlemage, they saw the popularity of mods that created a battle royale game atop existing games. The Culling was envisioned to be the first standalone battle royale game on Steam, with the potential to tap into the esports market. The game, as developed, required players that had been killed off to remain in the match, which necessitated the need for Xaviant to provide a robust spectator mode for these players to watch the remaining match play out. Late in the development process, they also recognized this would help the popularity of the game in video game live streaming.
Xaviant first announced The Culling in February 2016. After a brief closed alpha period, the game was released into early access on Windows via Steam on March 4, 2016, where it quickly rose to one of the top ten games played on Steam according to Steam Spy.

In March 2017, PlayerUnknown's Battlegrounds was released on Steam in early access. Battlegrounds was another battle royale game which gained popularity quickly over the next year. This caused The Cullings player counts to drop significantly after May 2017. In December 2017, Xaviant announced that development for the game was halting, so that they could work on "a new title". Xaviant left The Culling servers open for players to continue to use.

Sequel and reboot
In mid-June 2018, Xaviant announced it was preparing to release a sequel, The Culling 2, which they had been working on since stopping development of the first game. At this point in time, Fortnite Battle Royale had been released and surpassed the popularity of PlayerUnknown's Battlegrounds, and Xaviant's decision to release The Culling 2 in the oversaturated market was questioned. Xaviant's director of operations Josh Van Veld believed that the timing was right, as it had been about two years since The Cullings initial release, making it a fresh title, and that The Culling 2 would be released without an early access period. The announcement came around the same time that leaked images from The Culling 2 had been discovered, with fans of the first game criticizing the look and feel for being too close to PlayerUnknown's Battlegrounds. Van Veld said the choice to make the game more similar to Battlegrounds was to reflect the trend that the battle royale genre had seen over the last two years. Within The Culling 2, match sizes were increased to 50 players.

The Culling 2 was released on July 10, 2018 for Windows, PlayStation 4, and Xbox One. The game was criticized by players for appearing to be an unfinished title, its release timed to hit the middle of the popularity of battle royale games. Additionally, the release occurred on the same day as the start of a new season within Fortnite: Battle Royale. Steam peak player counts for the game on its first day were around 250 players and within 40 hours the game dropped to a single player.

On July 18, 2018, Xaviant decided to pull The Culling 2 from storefronts, close down its servers and refund all purchases. Additionally, Xaviant stated they would instead retake up development and support of the original game towards making it a free-to-play title. The rebooted game, The Culling: Origins, returned The Culling to a state similar to when it was first released on early access in March 2016, including bringing back features that had been removed during its release development, as well as new graphics, features and optimizations featured in the latest build. Anyone who owns the game is granted access to The Culling: Day One, an exact replica of the game in its original state, when it was released in March 2016, with a few bug fixes. The Culling: Day One allows players to replay the game in its earliest form and is to be used as a reference point for the free-to-play release to ensure the game is as fun as its first release so it does not lose what makes it unique.

Xavient announced in March 2019 that revenue from the rebooted The Culling was not sufficient to cover their ongoing expenses, and were thus planning on closing down the servers in May 2019; offline portions of the game would otherwise remain playable.

On March 25, 2019, the title was made unavailable for purchase on Steam and de-listed from the Xbox Store.

On May 12, 2020, Xaviant announced that The Culling would return to Xbox One, re-branded as The Culling: Origins, with a "pay-per-match" model. Originally, Xaviant Games announced that players could only play one match per day without a token. However, after considerable backlash, it was announced that this would be changed to ten games per day. By Nov 13th, 2020 the servers had been shut down and Xaviant had few to no employees supporting the game.

References

External links 
 

2017 video games
Battle royale games
Early access video games
First-person adventure games
Linux games
Video games developed in the United States
Windows games
Xbox One games
Xbox Play Anywhere games
Multiplayer online games
Unreal Engine games